Prohodna is a karst cave in north central Bulgaria, located in the Iskar Gorge near the village of Karlukovo in Lukovit Municipality, Lovech Province. The cave is known for the two eye-like holes in its ceiling, known as God's eyes.

Prohodna is the best known attraction in the Karlukovo Gorge (part of the Geological Park Iskar-Panega), one of the largest karst regions in Bulgaria and a popular location for speleology. The cave has two entrances which lie opposite one another, known respectively as the Small Entrance and the Big Entrance. The cave owes its name, which literally means  Thoroughfare Cave or Passage Cave, to this feature. The size of the Big Entrance of Prohodna makes it suitable for bungee jumping, and it is among the popular spots in Bulgaria for that activity. There are traces of prehistoric habitation in the Prohodna cave, which testify that humans lived in the cave during the Neolithic and Chalcolithic.

Prohodna is most notable for the two equal-sized holes in the ceiling of its middle chamber. The holes, formed through erosion, let in light into the cave. The formation is popularly known as God's eyes. The phenomenon was featured in the 1988 Bulgarian film Time of Violence; in the scene, a priest named Aligorko prays below the Eyes.

It is also accessible from Rumyantsevo, and there is a parking lot near the Small Entrance. Near Prohodna is the much longer cave Temnata Dupka, and a pathway from the Big Entrance of Prohodna leads to the Petar Tranteev National Caving House, one of the 100 Tourist Sites of Bulgaria.

References

External links
Prohodna cave (Eyes of god) - Pictures

 The eyes of God, Prohodna Caves Random-Times.com

Landforms of Lovech Province
Caves of Bulgaria